The men's 200 metres event at the 2001 Summer Universiade was held at the Workers Stadium in Beijing, China on 30–31 August.

Medalists

Results

Heats
Wind:Heat 1: +1.7 m/s, Heat 2: ? m/s, Heat 3: +0.2 m/s, Heat 4: 0.0 m/s, Heat 5: 0.0 m/s, Heat 6: -0.1 m/s, Heat 7: ? m/s, Heat 8: +1.1 m/s

Quarterfinals
Wind:Heat 1: +0.8 m/s, Heat 2: +1.4 m/s, Heat 3: +0.2 m/s, Heat 4: -0.3 m/s

Semifinals
Wind:Heat 1: +2.7 m/s, Heat 2: +1.5 m/s

Final

References

Athletics at the 2001 Summer Universiade
2001